Timothy Allan Harikkala (born July 15, 1971) is a former professional baseball pitcher. He is an alumnus of Florida Atlantic University, where he played baseball for the Owls under head coach Kevin Cooney.

Career
Drafted by the Seattle Mariners in the 34th round of the 1992 Major League Baseball draft, Harikkala would make his Major League Baseball debut with Seattle on May 27, .

He played for Samsung Lions and LG Twins in South Korea from 2005 to 2007. He would make 71 major league relief appearances before making his second major league start for the Colorado Rockies on August 12, . With 4,021 days passing between these two starts, Harikkala holds the MLB record for time elapsed between two starts.

Harikkala was a member of the York Revolution of the Atlantic League.

Harikkala played in SM-league in Finland (Finnish Baseball and Softball Federation (FBSF)) during the 2010 season. 

Harikkala has spent time after his pro baseball career playing for the Hortonville Stars of the Dairyland League in Hortonville, WI

In 2017, Harikkala was named Varsity Head Coach for the Appleton Xavier Hawks baseball team in Appleton, Wisconsin.

External links

Korea Baseball Organization
Pura Pelota (Venezuelan Winter League)
Baseball Team Expos – Ennakko: Harikkala debytoi kun Expos kohtaa Icen 30.6 (Finnish)

1971 births
Living people
American expatriate baseball players in Canada
American expatriate baseball players in Mexico
American expatriate baseball players in South Korea
American expatriate sportspeople in Finland
American people of Finnish descent
Appleton Foxes players
Baseball players from Florida
Bellingham Mariners players
Boston Red Sox players
Bravos de Margarita players
Caribes de Oriente players
Colorado Rockies players
Colorado Springs Sky Sox players
Florida Atlantic Owls baseball players
Florida Atlantic University alumni
Gigantes del Cibao players
American expatriate baseball players in the Dominican Republic
Guerreros de Oaxaca players
Huntsville Stars players
Indianapolis Indians players
Jacksonville Suns players
KBO League pitchers
LG Twins players
Major League Baseball pitchers
Memphis Chicks players
Mexican League baseball pitchers
Navegantes del Magallanes players
American expatriate baseball players in Venezuela
Oakland Athletics players
Orlando Rays players
Ottawa Lynx players
Pawtucket Red Sox players
Riverside Pilots players
Sacramento River Cats players
Samsung Lions players
Seattle Mariners players
Sportspeople from West Palm Beach, Florida
Tacoma Rainiers players
Tiburones de La Guaira players
Tigres de Aragua players
York Revolution players